Takamaro Shigaraki (1926 – 26 September 2014) was a Japanese Buddhist philosopher and priest within the Honganji-ha branch of Jōdo Shinshū. Shigaraki is widely regarded as one of the most influential Buddhologists of the Jōdo Shinshū in the 20th century.

Shigaraki was born in Hiroshima in 1926. The former president of Ryukoku University spent his career studying Pure Land Buddhism. He was on the faculty of Ryukoku University, Kyoto, Japan, since 1958. He tried to clarify a contemporary meaning of Buddhism through looking into Shinran’s thought from a perspective of existentialism. Shigaraki has been influenced by Paul Tillich.

He died of chronic respiratory failure, on 26 September 2014.

Select bibliography 
 A Life of Awakening. The Heart of the Shin Buddhist Path.  Translation by David Matsumoto. Hozokan Publishing, Kyoto, 2005
 Sogar der Gute wird erlöst, um wie viel mehr der Böse. Der Weg des buddhistischen Meisters Shinran. Übersetzt und mit einem Vorwort versehen von Volker Zotz. Kairos Edition, Luxembourg 2004, 
  Jōdokyō ni okeru shin no kinkyū (Studie über den Glauben im Reinen Land Buddhismus) 1975
 Gendai shinshū kyōgaku (Gegenwärtige Shin-Lehren))
  Bukkyō no seimeikan (Die buddhistische Sicht des Lebens), Kyoto, 1994
  Shinran ni okeru shin no kinkyū (Studie über den Glauben in Shinrans Denken), Kyoto, 1995
  Shinran shisō o ikiru (Leben aus Shinrans Denken), Kyoto, 2003
  Kyoto, 2008

References

1926 births
2014 deaths
People from Hiroshima
20th-century Japanese philosophers
Buddhist writers
Japanese scholars of Buddhism
Buddhist existentialists
Japanese Buddhists
Jōdo Shinshū Buddhist priests
Existentialists